Murod is a masculine given name. Murodov (masculine) or Murodova (feminine) are patronymic surnames derived from it.

Murod may refer to:

People
 Murod Khanturaev (1987–2021), Uzbek mixed martial artist
 Murod Kholmukhamedov (born 1990), Uzbek footballer
 Murod Rajabov (born 1995), Uzbek footballer
 Murod Zukhurov (born 1983), Uzbek retired football goalkeeper

Fictional characters
 Emperor Murod of Orenia, villain of the video game Summoner

See also
 Murad

Uzbekistani given names
Masculine given names